West Medan, (Indonesian: Medan Barat) is one of 21 administrative districts (kecamatan) in the city of Medan, North Sumatra, Indonesia.

The boundaries of the district:
 To the north : Medan Deli
 To the south : Medan Petisah, Medan Maimun
 To the east  : East Medan
 To the west  : Medan Helvetia, Medan Petisah

At the 2010 census, it had a population of 70,771 inhabitants. Total area is 6.14 km2 and the population density in 2010 was 11,526 inhabitants/km2.

Residents 
The majority of this district population is Chinese, Malay, Batak, Indian, Javanese and Minangkabau.

Interesting Place 
 Kesawan
 Tjong A Fie Mansion
 Medan City Hall

References 

Districts of Medan